The Westbay Hungarian Mixed Doubles Curling Cup, also known as the Westbay ISS WCT Hungarian Open Mixed Doubles Championship is an annual mixed doubles curling tournament on the ISS Mixed Doubles World Curling Tour. It is held annually in March at the Kamaraerdei Curling Club in Budapest, Hungary. 

The purse for the event is €5,000. and its event categorization is 300 (highest calibre is 1000).

The event has been held since 2008, and has been part of the World Curling Tour since 2018.

Past champions (since 2014)

References

External links
Official website

World Curling Tour events
Curling competitions in Hungary
International sports competitions in Budapest
Mixed doubles curling